At the Battle of the River Berre in 737 Frankish forces under the command of Charles Martel intercepted a sizeable Arab force sent from Al-Andalus and led by Uqba ibn al-Hayyay to relieve the siege of Narbonne. The battle, which took place at the mouth of the River Berre (now in the Département of Aude), was a significant victory for Martel in the campaigns of 736–737. During this period  Martel effectively prevented greater Umayyad expansion beyond the Pyrenees.

After their resounding victory the Franks pursued the fleeing Arabs into the nearby sea-lagoons, "taking much booty and many prisoners". Martel's forces then devastated most of the principal settlements of Septimania, including Nîmes, Agde, Béziers and Maguelonne. Despite these victories a second expedition was needed later that year to regain control of Provence after Arab forces returned. According to Paul the Deacon's Historia Langobardorum the Arabs retreated when they learned that Martel had formed an alliance with the Lombards.

Narbonne had been captured by Al-Samh ibn Malik al-Khawlani, governor of Al-Andalus, in 719 or 720. The city was renamed Arbunah and turned into a military base for future operations. It remained in the hands of the Emir of Córdoba until it was captured by Martel's son, Pepin III, as a result of the Siege of Narbonne (752-759).

References

737
Battles involving Francia
Battles involving the Umayyad Caliphate
Islam in France
Berre
8th century in Francia
730s in the Umayyad Caliphate